Headwinds is a 2011 French drama film directed by Jalil Lespert.

Cast
Benoît Magimel as Paul Anderen
Isabelle Carré as Josée Combe
Antoine Duléry as Alex Anderen
Ramzy Bedia as Le déménageur
Bouli Lanners as Monsieur Bréhel
 as Justine Leblanc
Audrey Tautou as Sarah Anderen
Daniel Duval as Xavier, l'éditeur
Lubna Azabal as La mère de Yamine
Aurore Clément as Madame Pierson

References

External links

2011 drama films
2011 films
French drama films
Films directed by Jalil Lespert
2010s French films
2010s French-language films